is a former Japanese football player. He is currently the General Manager at JEF United Chiba

Playing career
Suzuki was born in Machida on June 11, 1971. After graduating from high school, he joined Nissan Motors (later Yokohama Marinos) in 1990. Through reserve team, he joined top team in 1992. He debuted in 1993 and he played many matches in 1994. He mainly played as right side back and right side midfielder. The club won the champions 1995 J1 League. However his opportunity to play decreased in 1998 and he moved to Kyoto Purple Sanga in October 1998. He played as regular player until 1999. In 2000, he moved to Gamba Osaka. In 2001, he moved to Vissel Kobe and played many matches. However he lost his opportunity to play in 2002 and moved to newly was promoted to J1 League club, Vegalta Sendai in June 2002. He retired end of 2003 season.

Club statistics

References

External links

1971 births
Living people
Association football people from Tokyo
Japanese footballers
J1 League players
Yokohama F. Marinos players
Kyoto Sanga FC players
Gamba Osaka players
Vissel Kobe players
Vegalta Sendai players
Association football defenders